Susann Götz (born  in Bad Muskau, East Germany) is a German ice hockey defender.

International career

Götz was selected for the Germany women's national ice hockey team in the 2006 and 2014 Winter Olympics. In 2006, she did not record a point in five games. In 2014, she had one goal and three assists in the five games.

Götz also played for Germany in the qualifying event for the 2014 Winter Olympics, the 2010 Olympics and the 2006 Olympics.

As of 2014, Götz has also appeared for Germany at eight IIHF Women's World Championships. Her first appearance came in 2004.

Career statistics

International career
Through 2013-14 season

References

External links
Eurohockey.com Profile
Sports-Reference Profile

1982 births
People from Bad Muskau
Living people
Olympic ice hockey players of Germany
Ice hockey players at the 2006 Winter Olympics
Ice hockey players at the 2014 Winter Olympics
German women's ice hockey defencemen
Sportspeople from Saxony